Elettaria is a genus of flowering plants in the family Zingiberaceae. They are native to India and Sri Lanka, but cultivated and naturalized elsewhere. One member of the genus, E. cardamomum, is a commercially important spice used as a flavouring agent in many countries.

In 2018, several species were removed from Elettaria and placed in a new genus called Sulettaria. These species are recognized as of October 2018:

 Elettaria cardamomum (L.) Maton - India
 Elettaria ensal (Gaertn.) Abeyw. - Sri Lanka

These former species from Malaysia and Indonesia were reclassified into Sulettaria in 2018:

 Elettaria brachycalyx S.Sakai & Nagam. - Sarawak
 Elettaria kapitensis S.Sakai & Nagam. - Sarawak
 Elettaria linearicrista S.Sakai & Nagam. - Sarawak, Brunei
 Elettaria longipilosa S.Sakai & Nagam. - Sarawak
 Elettaria longituba (Ridl.) Holttum - Sumatra, Peninsular Malaysia
 Eulettaria multiflora (Ridl.) R.M.Sm. - Sumatra, Sarawak
 Elettaria rubida R.M.Sm. - Sabah, Sarawak
 Elettaria stoloniflora (K.Schum.) S.Sakai & Nagam. - Sarawak
 Elettaria surculosa (K.Schum.) B.L.Burtt & R.M.Sm. - Sarawak

References

 University of Melbourne: Sorting Elettaria names

Alpinioideae
Zingiberaceae genera
Medicinal plants of Asia
Indian spices